Qaqortoq Heliport  is a heliport in the southern part of Qaqortoq, a town in the Kujalleq municipality in southern Greenland.

Airlines and destinations 

Air Greenland operates government contract flights to villages in the Qaqortoq region. These mostly cargo flights are not featured in the timetable, although they can be pre-booked. Departure times for these flights as specified during booking are by definition approximate, with the settlement service optimized on the fly depending on local demand for a given day.

Future

The future of the heliport is connected to the wider network of air traffic in southern Greenland. In December 2015 the Greenland government decided on construction of an airport close to Qaqortoq with a 1500-metre runway.

This length is considered the minimum requirement for supporting future economic development, especially within the tourism sector, allowing propeller aircraft of near 100 seats (such as DHC-8-Q400) to fly all seats used domestically and to Iceland. The access road to the airport site was completed as a gravel road in 2017, though it will eventually be an asphalt road when the airport is finally completed. The first rock blastings at the airport site were conducted at a ceremony during early November 2016.

Construction of the new airport was expected to begin in 2021, with completion in 2024. A large setback happened in April 2020 when the procurement of the airport construction was halted because all offers were well above the project budget. A contract with a construction company from Canada was finally signed in February 2022.

References

Heliports in Greenland
Qaqortoq